The Armenian Genocide can refer to:
The general topic of the Armenian genocide
The 2006 PBS documentary titled The Armenian Genocide